Robert Amft (7 December 1916 – 28 October 2012) was a painter, sculptor, photographer, designer born in Chicago.

Biography
Amft grew up during the Great Depression. After graduating from high school, he worked for a year for the New Deal's Civilian Conservation Corps in the Sawtooth Mountains of Idaho before enrolling in the School of the Art Institute of Chicago, studying at the Saugatuck Summer School of Painting. He graduated from the School of the Chicago Art Institute, 1939.

He entered advertising and publishing design upon graduation and taught at the Ray School in Chicago and the New Orleans Academy of Fine Arts. He was a senior book designer for the Language Arts Department at Scott Foresman & Co. His painting Sunday Afternoon in Lincoln Park won First Prize at the New Horizons Annual Exhibition in 1975, and his painting Head won the Renaissance Prize at the Artists of Chicago and Vicinity Show. In 1985, he won a Painting Award from the Beverly Art Center, and in 1986, he was Curator's Choice at the Art Sales and Rental Gallery of the Art Institute of Chicago. He has also exhibited his watercolors at the International Watercolor Show. In 2005, the Chicago Public Radio program Hello Beautiful! featured Amft in an extended audio visit to his home studio.

For more than 70 years, Amft worked in a variety of media—oils, watercolors, collages, sculptures, photographs. His photography and design have won over fifty awards and have been reproduced in Graphics Annual, N.Y. Art Director Annual, Life, and Photo Graphics. His sculpture, Dog, won an award in the 1994 Beverly Art Center Annual Exhibition and his Whistler's Mother sculpture won the Best of Show Award at the 1997 Later Impressions' Exhibit held at the James R. Thompson Center in Chicago.

Amft died in Myrtle Beach, South Carolina, on 28 October 2012, at the age of 95.

Solo exhibitions
 2014 Richardson Gallery "Robert Amft: Painter, Sculptor, Photographer, Designer" Conway, SC
 2012 Galleries Anaerobic Studios "Robert Amft: The Work" Myrtle Beach, SC
 2010 Maurice Sternberg Galleries: "Robert Amft: Still Out of His Mind" - Robert Amft: New Paintings, 1970-2010 (Chicago)
 2008 Maurice Sternberg Galleries: "Robert Amft: Out of His Mind" - Personal Paintings: 1938 - 1960 (Chicago)
 2006 Corbett vs Dempsey Gallery: "Paintings for Particular People — A Survey, 1935-2005" - Major Works (Chicago)
 2003 Woodland Pattern Book Center
 2003 "Robert Amft's Beastiary" (Milwaukee)
 1996 Intuit Gallery: Illinois — Photos 1996 (Chicago)
 1994 Rotunda Gallery: Illinois — Photos    (Highland Park)
 1994 Caputo Gallery (Madison, Wisconsin)
 1989 Illinois Printers (Springfield, Illinois)
 1985 One Illinois Center: "Recent Painting" (Chicago)
 1984 Kansas State University: "Watercolors"
 1982 Countryside Art Center (Arlington Heights)
 1981 Hammer & Hammer Gallery (Chicago)
 1981 Joy Horwich Gallery (Chicago)
 1979 Western Illinois University
 1970 Welna Gallery (Chicago)
 1970 Junior Museum (Art Institute, Chicago)
 1968 Medical Center (University of Illinois)
 1967, 1968 St. Xavier's College
 1964 Cliff Dwellers Club
 1963 Panoras Gallery (New York)
 1961, 1962, 1964 Old Town Art Center
 1957, 1959 Morris Gallery (New York)

Group exhibitions and awards
2008 "Chicago Art" Artropolis (Chicago)
2005 "Six Rings" Corbett vs Dempsey Gallery
2005 "Chicago at Mid Century" De Paul Art Museum (Chicago)
2005 "Art in Chicago" Pennsylvania Academy of Fine Art
2003 "Animal Images Show": First Prize — Sculpture "Coyote" Anti-Cruelty Society
2000 Triennial International Print (Cracow)
1997 Print & Drawing Annual 21st Harper College/Western Illinois University
1997 Bi-State Exhibition Museum of Art
1997 8th International Print Competition (Osaka Japan)
1997 "Roadside Attractions" Museum of Art Lafayette
1997 "Later Impressions": Best of Show (Chicago)
1996 Midwestern Sculpture South Bend Regional Art Center
1996 Annual Best of Photography Photographer's Forum
1995 Artforms Museum of Art Lafayette
1993 Genesis — Paintings R.H. Love Gallery (Chicago)
1993 Beverly Art Center: Sculpture Award
1993 "A Place in the World" - Photos, Alverno College (Milwaukee, Wisconsin)
1990 Midwestern Sculptures South Bend Art Center
1990 "Illinois Painters" Springfield Art Association
1986 Curators Choice Art Rental Gallery Art Institute Chicago
1985 Painting Award Beverly Art Center
1984 "Mainstreams '74" Marietta College (Marietta, Ohio)
1978 Painting and Sculpture Today (Indianapolis, Indiana)
1975 New Horizons — Painting Award Annual
1975 Chicago Vicinity Show: Renaissance Prize (Chicago)
1965 Washington Museum (Tacoma)
1958 Pennsylvania Academy Annual: Youngstown Ohio Purchase Prize Butler Institute of Art (New York)
1952 Hallmark Show: Hallmark Award
1947 Pepsi Cola Annual
1940, 1956, 1963, 1974, 1975 Chicago and Vicinity Show
1938, 1939, 1941 International Watercolor Show

Reviews
Interview with Robert and Peter Amft on Public Television Sis: ; -WTTW, "Chicago Tonight.", 2007 - 2008 OxBow Benefit, 2006, "Robert Amft — Artist of the Year"
Bonesteel, Michael. Review of photography at Rotunda Gallery, Highland Park, Illinois "Living in Their Own World", "Evanston Review", 18 February 1993
Two-man show at Art Rental Gallery. "Bulletin of the Art Institute of Cr'csa; November–December, 1978, vol. 72, no. 6
"Great Treasures from the Art Institute of Chicago", Reproductions of 7 of Amft's "Modified Masters", "Chicago Magazine", 4/77
Kultermann, Udo. "Van Gogh in Contemporary Art." "Art Voices South”,1/76
"Les Americans a Paris." Reproduction of "Pink Sunglasses" (Mona Lisa) “Le Dessin” 1/76
"Who's Who in American Art," 1976
Kind, Joshua. Article on Chicago Vicinity Show. Reproduction of "Heac Renaissance Prize, "New Examiner", 2/75
Reproduction of "Head". "Sun Times", 15 December 1974
Article related to Amft's winning First Prize in "New Horizons", 1972, Evanston Review 29 June 1972
Arts Club Members Show. "Chicago Sun Times", 22 April 1973
Schultze, Franze. Review of exhibition at Welna Gallery, "Chicago Daily News”, 18 March 1972
Anderson. Don. Review of Welna Exhibition, "Chicago Sun Times", 11 January 1970
Wagner, Robert. Review of exhibition at Welna Gallery, "Chicago Trlbune” 3 January 1970
Haydon, Harold. Review. "What does this talent outpour mean?" Review of 75th Artists of Chicago & Vicinity Show.
Burckhardt, Edith. Review of one-man show at Morris Gallery, New York    A-"Grandpa Moses of Concrete."
Article showing Amft's photographs of the sculpture of self-taught artist, Fred Smith. "LIFE", 11/69
Sawin, Martica. Review of one-man show at Morris Gallery, New York  “ Arts” Magazine 1/58

References

 Illinois, Cook County Birth Certificates, 1878-1922
 Official Robert Amft Website
 
 Galleries of Robert Amft's artwork on Flickr: https://www.flickr.com/photos/robertamftnet/albums

Civilian Conservation Corps people
Artists from Chicago
1916 births
2012 deaths
20th-century American painters
20th-century American male artists
American male painters
21st-century American painters
21st-century American male artists